Cinde Warmington is an American attorney and politician serving as a member of the Executive Council of New Hampshire from the 2nd district. Elected in November 2020, she assumed office on January 6, 2021.

Education 
Warmington earned a Bachelor of Science degree in medical technology from the University of Massachusetts Dartmouth, a Master of Business Administration from the University of Texas at Arlington, and a Juris Doctor from the University of New Hampshire School of Law.

Career 
Warmington began her career as a health care administrator. She has since worked as a health care attorney at Shaheen & Gordon, P.A. in the firm's health care practice group. She practiced health care law for 20 years. She was elected to the Executive Council of New Hampshire in 2020.

References 

Living people
New Hampshire Democrats
Members of the Executive Council of New Hampshire
University of Massachusetts Dartmouth alumni
University of Texas at Arlington alumni
University of New Hampshire School of Law alumni
New Hampshire lawyers
Politicians from Concord, New Hampshire
Year of birth missing (living people)
21st-century American women politicians
21st-century American politicians